Out of the Shadows is the eighth studio album by American country pop artist Billy Joe Royal, which was released in 1990.

The album landed on the Country Albums chart, reaching  #24 in 1990.

Track listing

Charts

Weekly charts

Year-end charts

References

1990 albums
Billy Joe Royal albums
Atlantic Records albums